Dino Cinieri (born 9 July 1955 in Firminy, Loire) is a French politician of the Republicans (LR) who serves as a member of the National Assembly of France, representing the Loire department. 

Ahead of the 2022 presidential elections, Cinieri publicly declared his support for Michel Barnier as the Republicans’ candidate.

References

1955 births
Living people
People from Firminy
French people of Italian descent
Rally for the Republic politicians
Union for a Popular Movement politicians
The Republicans (France) politicians
The Social Right
Christian Democratic Party (France) politicians
Deputies of the 12th National Assembly of the French Fifth Republic
Deputies of the 13th National Assembly of the French Fifth Republic
Deputies of the 14th National Assembly of the French Fifth Republic
Deputies of the 15th National Assembly of the French Fifth Republic
Regional councillors of Auvergne-Rhône-Alpes
Deputies of the 16th National Assembly of the French Fifth Republic